Finding Alice  is a British television comedy-drama produced by RED Production Company (a StudioCanal company) in association with Bright Pictures TV, Buddy Club Productions and Genial Productions. It premiered on ITV in the UK on 17 January 2021.

On 1 March 2021, it was announced that Finding Alice would return for a second series. The filming for the second season will begin in February 2022.
In August 2022, it was announced that Finding Alice season 2 has been cancelled by ITV.

Cast
The cast includes:
Keeley Hawes as Alice Dillon 
Kenneth Cranham as Gerry Walsh
Nigel Havers as Roger Dillon
Gemma Jones as Minnie Walsh
Joanna Lumley as Sarah Dillon
Ayesha Dharker as Tanvi Lal
Sharon Rooney as Nicola
Rhashan Stone as Nathan
Graeme Hawley as Graham Napely
Jason Merrells as Harry Walsh
Dominique Moore as Yasmina
George Webster as George
Isabella Pappas as Charlotte Walsh
Charlyne Francis as Detective Prior
Daniel Laurie as Zack

Episodes

Critical reception
Eleanor Bley Griffiths reviewing for the Radio Times described Finding Alice as "This interesting and ambitious drama", giving it four stars and adding that "Keeley Hawes gives a masterful performance in ITV’s darkly comic drama". Ben Dowell of The Times declared the drama's "classy acting outweighs the shopworn plot" and gave it four stars, Lucy Mangan for The Guardian mentions "thank god for Nigel Havers and Joanna Lumley" in her review giving it three stars, while Anita Singh of The Telegraph called the drama "a thriller, a comedy, or an episode of Grand Designs?" and gave it three stars.

References

External links

Finding Alice trailer from the ITV's YouTube channel

2021 British television series debuts
2021 British television series endings
2020s British comedy-drama television series
2020s British television miniseries
English-language television shows
ITV comedy-dramas
Television series by Red Production Company
Television series by StudioCanal